Elio Zamuto (born 1 May 1941 in Syracuse) is an Italian actor and voice actor.

Life and career 
Born in Syracuse as Elio Mazzamuto, Zamuto started his career in the mid-1960s, and had a prolific career between television and cinema, especially during the 1970s and mainly playing roles of seducer, gangster or police officer.

As voice actor, he is best known as the official Italian dubbing voice of Tom Selleck in the TV-series Magnum, P.I.

Partial filmography 

  (1969) - Le soldat jobard
 Un caso di coscienza (1970) - Nunzio
 The Sicilian Checkmate (1972) - Verzi
 Shadows Unseen (1972) - Sgt. Mortesi
 The Assassin of Rome (1972) - Italo Balbo
 Black Turin (1972) - Scarcella
 Shoot First, Die Later (1974) - Rio
 Silence the Witness (1974) - Judge Belli
 Prostituzione (1974) - Michele Esposito
 Il trafficone (1974) - Vito Macaluso
 How to Kill a Judge (1975) - Onorevole Ugo Selimi
 Calling All Police Cars (1975) - Professore Giacometti
 Gamma (1975) - Procuratore Forel
 Werewolf Woman (1976) - Psychiatrist
 Violent Naples (1976) - Franco Casagrande
 Bloody Payroll (1976) - Police Commissioner Foschi
 Destruction Force (1977) - Belli
 Il mammasantissima (1979) - Avvocato
 The Nurse in the Military Madhouse (1979) - John - the Thief
 The Finzi Detective Agency (1979) - Commissario Salimbeni
 Blood Ties (1986)

References

External links 
 

1941 births
Italian male film actors
Italian male voice actors
People from Syracuse, Sicily
Actors from Sicily
Living people
Italian male television actors